Julian Ignacy Nowak (10 March 1865 – 7 November 1946) was a Polish microbiologist and politician who served as 9th Prime Minister of Poland in 1922.

Nowak studied medicine at the Jagiellonian University in 1886–1893 and was a professor there since 1899. In 1921–1922 he was a rector of the university. Being a conservative politician, he served as the Prime Minister briefly in 1922. In the same year, he also served briefly as the Minister of Religious Affairs. In 1922–1927 he was a Senator in the Polish Senate.

He was awarded the Commander's Cross of the Order of Polonia Restituta.

Julian Ignacy Nowak was buried in Rakowicki Cemetery.
He was the father of Olympic fencer Wanda Dubieńska.

1865 births
1946 deaths
People from Brzesko
People from the Kingdom of Galicia and Lodomeria
Polish Austro-Hungarians
Prime Ministers of Poland
Education ministers of Poland
Government ministers of Poland
Senators of the Second Polish Republic (1922–1927)
Polish microbiologists
Polish veterinarians
Jagiellonian University alumni
Academic staff of Jagiellonian University
Rectors of the Jagiellonian University
Commanders of the Order of Polonia Restituta
Mycoplasma
Burials at Rakowicki Cemetery